Guarumal is a corregimiento in Soná District, Veraguas Province, Panama with a population of 3,239 as of 2010. Its population as of 1990 was 3,726; its population as of 2000 was 3,340.

References

Corregimientos of Veraguas Province